Clare Amabel Margaret FitzRoy, Dowager Countess of Euston (née Kerr; born 15 April 1951) is the current Lord Lieutenant of Suffolk. She is also President of the Suffolk Agricultural Association with a particular interest in local breeds the Suffolk Punch horse and the Red Poll cow.

Born in Jedburgh as Lady Clare Kerr, Lady Euston is the fourth child of Peter Kerr, 12th Marquess of Lothian, and his wife Antonella (née Newland).

Clare married James FitzRoy, Earl of Euston, son and heir apparent to the 11th Duke of Grafton, on 16 September 1972. He predeceased his father in 2009.

Lord and Lady Euston had five children:
 Lady Louise Helen Mary FitzRoy (born 11 June 1973)
 Lady Emily Clare FitzRoy (born 6 December 1974)
 Henry Oliver Charles FitzRoy, 12th Duke of Grafton (born 6 April 1978)
 Lady Charlotte Rose FitzRoy (born 10 March 1983)
 Lady Isobel Anne FitzRoy (born 1985)

She had previously been High Sheriff and Deputy Lieutenant of Suffolk.

References

1951 births
People from Jedburgh
Living people
Euston
Daughters of British marquesses
Lord-Lieutenants of Suffolk
High Sheriffs of Suffolk
Deputy Lieutenants of Suffolk